Broke is the second studio album by American rock band Hed PE. Released on August 22, 2000, the album expanded the band's sound to incorporate classic rock and world music influences. It peaked at #63 on the Billboard 200, and features the band's best known single, "Bartender", which peaked at #23 on the Billboard Mainstream Rock Tracks chart and at #27 on the Modern Rock Tracks chart, and appeared on the retrospectives The Best of Hed Planet Earth and Major Pain 2 Indee Freedom: The Best of Hed P.E. The album sold over 250,000 copies.

Music 

In contrast to the band's first album, which largely mixed hardcore punk with hip hop, Broke incorporates new elements, including classic rock and world music influences.

Allmusic described the musical style of Broke as drawing from hip hop and that Hed PE "opted for slick production and mundane verse/chorus/verse formatting rather than continuing to blaze a path as the hip-hop-influenced hardcore band (hed)pe's debut album proudly announced they were." CMJ described the album's sound as combining "down-tuned guitars with booty-licious beats...and hardcore raps that are littered by more cussing than a sailor."

Beatdust described the band as "becoming another Limp Bizkit clone" with Broke and the subsequent Blackout, which were recorded to pay back the losses owed to the label to recoup the commercial failure of the band's 1997 self-titled debut album.

The album features guest appearances in recognition of Hed PE's hardcore punk and heavy metal influences, including Dead Kennedys guitarist East Bay Ray, who performs on the song "Waiting to Die", and singers Serj Tankian of System of a Down and Morgan Lander of Kittie, who appear on the song "Feel Good".

Release and reception 

The album peaked at #63 on the Billboard 200, while its first single, "Bartender", peaked at #23 on the Billboard Mainstream Rock Tracks chart and at #27 on the Modern Rock Tracks chart. A music video for "Killing Time", the second single from Broke, was produced in promotion of the film 3000 Miles To Graceland, which featured the song on its soundtrack.

Response from professional critics was mixed. Allmusic's Jason D. Taylor wrote that the album "may have not found as much success in the competitive mainstream market as some would have liked, and even despite its distinct departure from the group's debut, it is an album that shows more vision than other rap-tinged rock albums to come out in 2000."

Rolling Stone said that with Broke, "Rap metal has found its Motley Crue."

Q described the album's sound as being "Focused and mature" and said that Hed PE "possess the wherewithal to express their anger and frustration musically..."

Melody Maker said the album was "about as black as this pimp-rock is gonna get, hip-hop credible in a way no one in the field has been since Urban Dance Squad....it's a great album..."

The most negative response to the album came from critics who viewed its lyrics as misogynistic.

Legacy 
Jive Records included the songs "Bartender", "Killing Time", "Swan Dive", "The Meadow (Special Like You)" and "Feel Good" on the compilation The Best of Hed Planet Earth, which was released without the band's authorization, permission, consent, or knowledge.

"Bartender" and "Killing Time" were also included on Major Pain 2 Indee Freedom: The Best of Hed P.E., which was compiled by the band and released by Suburban Noize Records.

Track listing

Personnel 
 Jahred aka M.C.U.D. aka Paulo Sergio - vocals
 Wesstyle - guitars
 Chad aka Chizad - guitars
 DJ Product © 1969 - turntables
 B.C. aka B.C. The Mizak Diza - drums and percussion
 Mawk - bass

Guests 

 East Bay Ray - guitar on ''waiting to die''
 Serj Tankian - vocals on ''feel good''
 Morgan Lander - vocals on ''feel good''

References 

2000 albums
Hard rock albums by American artists
Hed PE albums
Jive Records albums
Nu metal albums by American artists
Rapcore albums
Rap metal albums
Albums produced by Machine (producer)